Ancylosis glaphyria is a species of snout moth in the genus Ancylosis. It was described by Boris Balinsky in 1987 and is known from South Africa and Namibia.

References

Moths described in 1987
glaphyria
Insects of Namibia
Moths of Africa